Cosmo Anthony Cilano (March 22, 1893 – September 29, 1937) was an American lawyer and politician from New York.

Life
He was born on March 22, 1893, in Buffalo, New York, the son of Anthony Cilano and Louise (Privitera) Cilano. He had six siblings:  Lena (born 1900), Frank, Josephine, Pauline, Peter, and Charles Anthony (born 2/6/1912).  The family removed to Rochester in 1901. There he attended the public schools and graduated from East High School in 1912. He graduated from University of Buffalo Law School in 1915.

In June 1918, he joined the U.S. Navy as a hospital apprentice, and served until January 1919.

Cilano was a member of the New York State Assembly (Monroe Co., 3rd D.) in 1925, 1926, 1927 and 1928.

He was a member of the New York State Senate (45th D.) from 1929 to 1934, sitting in the 152nd, 153rd, 154th, 155th, 156th and 157th New York State Legislatures. In January 1931, he succeeded Caleb H. Baumes as chairman of the New York State Crime Commission.

He was very active in the NYS Legislature, involved in the creation of many new bills, working closely with Governor F.D. Roosevelt.  During the depression, to help job creation, he proposed what later became the NYS Thruway.

He died unmarried on September 29, 1937, at the Ray Brook Sanitarium near Lake Placid, New York, of tuberculosis.

Notes

1893 births
1937 deaths
Republican Party New York (state) state senators
Politicians from Rochester, New York
Republican Party members of the New York State Assembly
20th-century deaths from tuberculosis
University at Buffalo Law School alumni
Politicians from Buffalo, New York
Tuberculosis deaths in New York (state)
20th-century American politicians
Lawyers from Buffalo, New York
Lawyers from Rochester, New York
20th-century American lawyers